The Baddest is first compilation album of Japanese singer Toshinobu Kubota, released on October 8, 1989. The album peaked at number one and was certified million.

On February 9, 2009, Sony Music Entertainment Records released Blu-spec CD Limited Edition of the album .

Track listing

References

1989 compilation albums
Toshinobu Kubota albums
Sony Music Entertainment Japan compilation albums